This is a list of the queen consorts of the major kingdoms and states that existed in present-day Philippines. Only the senior queens—i.e. those with the rank of Dayang ("Lady")  and Lakambini ("Queen")—are listed.

Rankings of consorts

Prior to the Archaic epoch (c. 900–1565), the consorts of the Filipino monarchs were organized in three general tiers: Dayang, Lakambini, and Binibini, or even the word Hara is a Malayo-Sanskrit terms in which referred to a Queen in western sense, also meant the chief queen of the states and polities which is in the influence of India or Animist states (see also Indianized kingdoms).

The title Sultana or sultanah  is an Islamic title and a feminine form of the word Sultan. This term has been legally used for some Muslim women monarchs and sultan's consorts. Nevertheless, westerners have used the title to refer to Muslim women monarchs specially in the southern part of the Philippines, which is in the Islamic influence (like Sulu and Maguindanao), sultan's women relatives who don't hold this title officially.

List of consorts

Legendary consorts
 Legendary consorts and their husbands are mentioned in the folktales and oral traditions.
 Some of the Queen consorts are claimed to be mythical, but proven to be a historic figure according in the written documents like Queen Urduja for example, she is mentioned historically as the Queen of Caboloan in Chinese accounts, but also mentioned as the Queen of the legendary kingdom of Tawalisi, found in the travel account of Ibn Battuta.

Historical consorts

Caboloan (Pangasinan Wangdom)

Tondo Dynasty
Tondo have a personal union with Namayan through the traditional lineage of Kalangitan and Bagtas.

Namayan
Namayan have a personal union with Tondo through the traditional lineage of Kalangitan and Bagtas. (Legendary antiquity)

Maynila

According to Bruneian oral tradition, a city with the Malay name of Selurong, which would later become the city of Maynila) was formed around the year 1500. According to some of these oral traditions, the Sultanate of Brunei under Sultan Bolkiah attacked the Kingdom of Tondo, and established Selurong.

Rajahnate of Cebu

Kedatuan of Dapitan

Sultanate of Maguindanao

Sultanate of Sulu

See also
First Lady or First Gentleman of the Philippines
Binukot -  Filipino cultural practice that secludes a young person (usually a young woman)
History of the Philippines (900–1521)
List of sovereign state leaders in the Philippines
List of recorded Datus in the Philippines
Filipino styles and honorifics
Greater India

References

External links
 http://www.philstar.com/nation/196317/pangasinan-government-almost-lost-urduja-house-lot
Hector Santos' A Philippine Document from 900 A.D.
Paul Morrow's THE LAGUNA COPPERPLATE INSCRIPTION
RAJAH HUMABON (Ca. 1521) King of Cebu
Cebu eskrima
The official website of Boholchronicle

15th-century monarchs in Asia
Filipino datus, rajas and sultans
History of the Philippines (900–1565)
Queens consort
Ancient Philippines, List of royal consorts of